Gantt is a surname. Notable people with the surname include:

 Bob Gantt (1922–1994), American basketball player
 David F. Gantt (1941–2020), member of the New York State Assembly
 Edward Gantt (1746–1837), American Episcopal clergyman
 Fred Gantt (1922–2002), American basketball player
 Harvey Gantt (born 1943), architect and politician
 Henry Gantt (1861–1919), mechanical engineer and management consultant
 Love Gantt (1875–1935), American physician
 W. Horsley Gantt (1892–1980), American psychologist and physiologist